Eva Ybarra (born March 2, 1945) known as the "Queen of the Accordion", is a professional conjunto musician.

Early life 
Ybarra was born on the west side of San Antonio, Texas, one of nine children. Her father was a truck driver. As a child, she played piano and accordion, later recounting: "I started by listening to the radio, and I learnt by ear, copying what I heard. But I didn't want to copy anyone, I wanted my own style." She performed locally and on the radio from a young age, and won her first record deal at age 14 with Rosina Records.

Musical career 
Ybarra writes original music as the leader of the band Eva Ybarra y Su Conjunto. She is known for using non-standard chord progressions in her compositions. She has said about her style: "I use a lot of inversions and scales. Pentatonic scales. Major 9th chords...I go to dances and can play traditional for people to dance, but I prefer concerts where I can play progressive music." She performs on the accordion as well as the bajo sexto, guitarrón, electric bass, and keyboards.

Her albums include A Mi San Antonio (1994), and Romance Inolvidable (Unforgettable Romance) (1996). They encompass several styles of music including rancheras, country songs, bolero tangos, huapangos, and ballads. Some of her well-known songs include "A mi San Antonio", "El gallito madrugador" (The Early Rising Rooster), "El perico loco" (The Crazy Parrot), and "A bailar con Eva" (Dance with Eva).

Ybarra began performing regularly in the Tejano Conjunto Festival, hosted by the Guadalupe Cultural Arts Center, in 1981. She has also taught music performance at the University of Washington and Palo Alto College, at the Guadalupe Cultural Arts Center in San Antonio, and for the Apprenticeship Program of Texas Folklife. She was featured in the touring exhibit "American Sabor: Latinos in U.S. Popular Music."

She continues to live and perform in San Antonio.

Discography

Albums
 A Mi San Antonio (1994, Rounder CD 6056)
 Romance Inolvidable (1996, Rounder CD 6062)
 Space Needle (2004, Consonante International)
 Mi Gloria (2004, Evari)
 La Pura Alegria, with Gloria García Abadia (2004, Evari)

Singles
 "Entre Suspiro y Suspiro" / "Negro Destino" (1970s, Hacienda HAC-498)

Various artist compilation albums

Awards and honors
2003: inducted into the Guadalupe Cultural Arts Center Conjunto Hall of Fame
2008: inducted into the Tejano R.O.O.T.S Hall of Fame
2008: inducted into the Univision Salon de Fama
2009: inducted into the Tejano Conjunto Music Hall of Fame and Museum 
2015: received the South Texas Conjunto Association Lifetime Achievement Award 
2017: received a National Heritage Fellowship awarded by the National Endowment for the Arts, which is the United States government's highest honor in the folk and traditional arts
2022: on May 18, 2021, the Texas Legislature in collaboration with the Texas Commission on the Arts designated Ybarra as the 2022 Texas State Musician

References

External links 
 Official Website 
 
 
 Video of Ybarra at the 2017 NEA National Heritage Fellowships Concert

1945 births
Living people
20th-century accordionists
21st-century accordionists
20th-century American women musicians
21st-century American women musicians
American accordionists
Tejano accordionists
Musicians from San Antonio
Songwriters from Texas
National Heritage Fellowship winners
Rounder Records artists
20th-century American musicians
21st-century American musicians